Jubilee Hall is a royal palace built in 1913 during the reign of Mir Osman Ali Khan of erstwhile Hyderabad state in India. It is considered one of the architectural masterpieces of Hyderabad.

It is located in the green lawns of Public Gardens earlier known as Bagh-e-Aam.

History

In 1937, the silver jubilee coronation of the HEH Nizam VII was held here, hence the name. A special gold plated chair was made on this occasion with his crest inscribed. The chair is now exhibited at Purani Haveli.

The Nizam, on the occasion, received gifts and mementos. The Royal works and paintings from the Durbar still adorn the building.

At the time the world was yet to see another Indian spectacle of pomp and power as that of the Jubilee Durbar, with warlike display of 10,000 Hyderabad troops.

Architecture

The building was designed by Zain Yar Jung. The building has an elegant facade built in the Indo-Persian style. At the center, a small but high stage for the throne of Nizam was built, in the shape of 'Dastar'(Crown) of the Nizam. It is clearly visible as the white square in the middle.

The huge rectangular hall of the Jubilee Hall, served as the State's Legislative Council for 27 years, before the Council moved to its present building. Jubilee Hall now serves as a state conference hall and for State Government functions.

See also
Chowmahalla Palace
Purani Haveli
King Kothi Palace
Falaknuma Palace

Further reading
Fodor's India By Curtis, William, Fodor, Eugene, 1905- 
Developments in Administration Under H.E.H. the Nizam VII By Shamim Aleem, M. A. Aleem

External links

 The Hindu feature

Hyderabad State
Palaces in Hyderabad, India
Heritage structures in Hyderabad, India
Buildings and structures completed in 1913
1913 establishments in India
20th-century architecture in India